, known in Thailand as Hanuman vs. 7 Ultraman (หนุมาน พบ 7 ยอดมนุษย์ - Hanuman pob Jed Yodmanud), is a Japanese tokusatsu superhero kaiju film produced in 1974 by Tsuburaya Productions of Japan and Chaiyo Productions of Thailand. It was released theatrically in Japan on March 17, 1979.

Plot

A young boy named Kochan visits a temple in Thailand to carry out a rain dance, believing it could cure the world of an ongoing drought caused by the Sun becoming closer to Earth. Three robbers break into the temple and take priceless artifacts. The robbers beat the boy when he tries to step in, but when he gets up and chases after them and climbs into their jeep, he is shot in the face, killing him. Fortunately, Mother of Ultra, witnessing the incident from Nebula M78, revives the child, granting him the ability to transform into the legendary deity Hanuman. As Hanuman, Kochan tries to persuade the Sun to move back to its normal location, but he turns back to normal briefly when the robbers reappear and try to shoot him. However, the bullets harmlessly bounce off his skin, and he transforms into Hanuman again to take revenge, crushing the thieves with his fist.

Meanwhile, a Weather modification experiment is being conducted using sounding rockets. While the first rocket test goes ahead as planned, causing rainfall, the second explodes on its launchpad, causing a chain reaction that destroys the others at the test site in a massive detonation. The explosion creates an earthquake which in turn causes a fissure to form in the ground, from which emerge five evil monsters. They are Gomora (from Ultraman), Dustpan (originally from Mirrorman, being the only monster out of the set to not originate in a main Ultra Series entry), Astromons, Tyrant and Dorobon (all from Ultraman Taro), which were accidentally awakened by a rocket test gone terribly wrong. Koh transforms into Hanuman, but is rapidly overpowered by the monsters. 

Hanuman calls on the Six Ultra Brothers for help; Ultraman, Zoffy, Ultraseven, Ultraman Jack, Ultraman Ace, and Ultraman Taro, who travel from the Land of Light to aid him. Eventually, the seven heroes triumph over the monsters, and all return home.

Cast
 Ko Kaeoduendee as Kochan / Hanuman
 Anan Pricha as Anan
 Yodchai Meksuwan as Dr. Wisut
 Pawana Chanajit as Marissa
 Sripouk as Sipuak
 Srisuriya as Sisuliya
 Kan Booncho as Bandit 
 Chan Wanpen as Bandit
 Somnouk as Bandit
 Hikaru Urano as Zoffy
 Toshio Furukawa as Ultraman
 Kohji Moritsugu as Ultraseven
 Jirō Dan as Ultraman Jack
 Keiji Takamine as Ultraman Ace
 Saburō Shinoda as Ultraman Taro
 Taeko Kamisaka as Mother of Ultra
 Kunio Suzuki as Gomora
 Umeda Shinichi as Dustpan
 Toru Kawai as Tyrant
 Takeshi Watabe as Dorobon
 Sakamoto Michihiro as Astromons

Release 
In 1984, Chaiyo Productions re-edited the film and released it under the title Hanuman vs. 11 Ultraman (หนุมาน พบ 11 ยอด มนุษย์ -Hanuman pob Sibed Yodmanud) after being released in Thailand the film was released in United States under the title Space Warriors 2000 (The Year of the Monkey Wrench).

References

External links
 
 

1974 films
1974 multilingual films
1970s superhero films
1970s science fiction films
Ultra Series films
Japanese science fiction films
Crossover tokusatsu films
Films directed by Sompote Sands
Japanese multilingual films
Thai science fiction films
Thai national heritage films
Thai multilingual films
Thai crossover films
1970s Japanese films